"You're the Greatest Lover" is a single by the Dutch girl group Luv'. It was first released in July 1978 by Philips/Phonogram Records. It appears on the 1978 debut album With Luv' and on compilations (Luv' Gold, 25 Jaar Na Waldolala, Completely In Luv'...). It is the group's international breakthrough as it was successful in a large part of Continental Europe, Israel and South Africa. Luv' reached its peak with this million-seller. It is often considered as the signature song of the female pop act.

A decade later, the German subsidiary of Philips re-issued the track as a CD single. In 1993, the Dutch Top 40 hit "Megamix '93" was backed with a Eurodance remix of "The Greatest Lover".

Background
In the spring of 1978, manager Han Meijer filed a lawsuit against Patty Brard, José Hoebee and Marga Scheide who were not satisfied by the way he developed their career. Meijer considered the name of the formation as his ownership and took the three singers to court about the use of it. Finally, in early June 1978, the ladies won the legal action and were officially allowed to be named Luv'. Pim ter Linde became their new manager. They were ready to concentrate on their main goal: to have an international career.
After the success of U.O.Me in Benelux, Hans van Hemert and Piet Souer, the group's songwriters, noticed that the light pop/disco and Latin American arrangements were more appropriate than a more serious repertoire (like the trio's first singles). They composed "You're the Greatest Lover" which featured Spanish guitars. It became a big selling record as it entered the charts in a dozen countries. This track was the first of a string of international hit singles. It reached the first position in some countries in Continental Europe. It was entitled "Sing Me, Sing Me a Chanson" to adapt the French market and succeeded in reaching the Top 20 in South Africa. A Spanish version (entitled "Eres Mi Mejor Amante") was recorded, which permitted Luv' to have a hit in Spain.

Because Luv' performed "You're the Greatest Lover" on two famous German TV music shows (Disco and Musikladen), the female pop trio became a household group in German-speaking countries. The song, which sold 600.000 units in Germany was part of the soundtrack of the fifty-fourth episode (entitled "Anschlag auf Bruno") of Derrick (TV series).

The track was also used over the credits of a 1979 German sex comedy film called Sunnyboy und Sugarbaby, which received significant late-night airplay in the early days of HBO under its English-language title, She's 19 and Ready. The song was also popular behind the Iron Curtain, especially in East Germany, Poland and Hungary as it was frequently aired on communist radio stations. However, records distribution was limited in the Eastern Bloc. Sales were hard to evaluate in this part of the world.

Commercial performance
"You're the Greatest Lover" was a #1 hit single in the Netherlands, Flanders (Belgium), Germany, and Switzerland. The Spanish version of the song entitled "Tu Eres Mi Mejor Amante" hit also the number-one spot in Spain.

It was also successful in Austria and to a lesser extent in France, Finland, Israel and South Africa. Because of the good performance in the above-mentioned territories, the record reached the 5th position of the Europarade (currently the Eurochart Hot 100 Singles) which combined the weekly charts of various European countries into a single countdown.

According to a special issue of Billboard magazine about the German recording industry published on December 8, 1979, the single sold 650.000 copies in the Federal Republic of Germany (where it turned gold). It also sold 100.000 copies in France and 150.000 copies in the Netherlands (platinum certification). In total, more than one million units of the record were sold worldwide.

1989 reissue, appearance on compilations and 1993 remix
In 1989, Luv' was reformed by original member Marga Scheide and two other vocalists to promote new recordings released by Dureco Records. At the same time, Luv's first record company, Philips, decided to repackage the old repertoire of the pop act. That's why a Mini CD single came out in Germany only, which included three songs from the original group's back catalogue: the 1978 number one hits "You're the Greatest Lover" and Trojan Horse as well as the disco track Everybody's Shakin' Hands On Broadway. In 1993, a Dance remix was included on the CD single version of Megamix '93. Moreover, due to its popularity, "The Greatest Lover" was part of the track listings of Luv's main compilations (Greatest Hits, Luv' Gold, 25 Jaar Na Waldolala and Completely In Luv').

Track listing and release
Philips/Phonogram licensed the rights for Luv's records to various labels around the world.

1978 Original release: 7" Vinyl
 "You're the Greatest Lover" - 2:50
 "Everybody's Shaking Hands On Broadway" - 3:27

1989 Re-issue: Mini CD single

 "You're the Greatest Lover"
 "Everybody's Shaking Hands On Broadway"
 "Trojan Horse"

Cover versions

 In 1978, Ulla Norden covered the song in German as "Wir Sind Verrückt (Wir Beide)".
 In 1978, the cover band The Hiltonaires recorded "You're the Greatest Lover" on German compilations "Hits For Young People 18" and "Top Disco"
 In 1979, Jonathan King recorded a cover version of Luv's hit that peaked at #67 on the UK Singles Charts.
 Disco Light Orchestra from Germany performed an instrumental version for their LP Disco Sensation in 1979.
 Franz Lambert performed "You're the Greatest Lover" on the German compilation "Pop-Orgel Hitparade 4" in 1979.
 James Last orchestra performed an instrumental version on his album New Non Stop Dancing 79.
 Teenage singer Eini covered the song (entitled "Vetonaula") in Finnish in 1979".
 Finnish cover band Taru recorded the song as "Vetonaula" on the "Disco City 3" compilation in 1979.
 Finnish cover band Disco Ape recorded a version of "You're the Greatest Lover" in 1979.
 Irish pop group Gina, Dale Haze and the Champions had a top 10 hit with this song on the Irish Charts in 1979.
 In 1979, German singer Karl Dall sang it as "Hey Hallo, Ich Bin Die Größte Nummer". 
 In 1980, British group Brotherhood of Man recorded a version of the song for their Good Fortune album.
 East German sister duet, Die Molly Sisters, sang a German version entitled "He, hallo, du bist ein Mann geworden".
 Accordion duo Kirmesmusikanten covered the track for the "28 Super-Sommer-Sonnen-Hits non-stop" compilation released in the Netherlands and Germany in 1985.
 In 1994, German female singer Angie van Burg covered it as "Wir Sind Verrückt (Wir Beide)".
 The Hallmond All Stars orchestra performed an instrumental version on the compilation Night Fever Hammond Hit Parade released in the UK in 1996.
 In 1999, Kristina Bach sang a Schlager version (entitled "Hey, ich such' hier nicht den größten Lover").
 In 2000, a dance music oriented cover by Loona renamed "Latino Lover" was a Top 10 hit single in German speaking countries (#6 and gold single (250 000 units sold) in Germany, #9 in Austria and #6 in Switzerland).
 In 2002, Rob Ronalds covered it in Dutch as "Kanjer". His version reached #57 on the Dutch Single Top 100.  
 German industrial band Massiv in Mensch recorded an electro version in 2004.
 In 2004, Dutch girl group recorded a medley entitled "Greatest Lovers" that included "You're the Greatest Lover".
 In 2005, the version of "The Greatest Lover" by Flemish dance group Swoop peaked at #25 on the Ultratop singles charts in Flanders.
 In 2008, Renate Fuchs' version in German was entitled "Hey, kumm loss m'r Fastelovend fiere".
 In 2016, Dutch act Huub Hangop feat. DJ Maurice sang it as "Ik wil met jou een selfie".
 In 2016, German singer Jack Gelee covered it as "Ich will mit Dir ein Selfie". 
 In 2016, German act Feierwut performed a version entitled "Hey Hallo wir sind heut auf Mallorca". 
 In 2020, Dutch Drag act RisQGay released a single entitled The Greatest Latino Lover (a cover version and mashup of Latino Lover by Loona and You're the Greatest Lover by Luv').
 In 2021, Dutch act Bert & Vief covered it as "De Grootste Liefhebber". 
 In 2022, Dutch singer Johnny Gold covered it as " Hey Hallo (je bent de grootste lovert)".
 In 2022, German DJ Clubstone recorded an EDM version entitled "Greatest Lover".

Charts and certifications

Weekly charts

Year-end charts

References

1978 songs
1978 singles
1989 singles
Brotherhood of Man songs
Luv' songs
Jonathan King songs
Number-one singles in Belgium
Number-one singles in Germany
Dutch Top 40 number-one singles
Number-one singles in Switzerland
Songs written by Hans van Hemert
Songs written by Piet Souer
Philips Records singles
Phonogram Records singles
Mercury Records singles
Carrere Records singles